Hotel alojamiento is a 1966 Argentine film comedy written by Augusto Giustozzi and Horacio de Dios and directed by Fernando Ayala.

Cast
Emilio Alfaro
Gogó Andreu
Tono Andreu
Rosángela Balbó
Jorge Barreiro
Fina Basser
Guillermo Battaglia
Rodolfo Bebán
María Aurelia Bisutti
Olinda Bozán
Augusto Codecá
Mariel Comber
Rodolfo Crespi
María Concepción César
Cacho Espíndola

External links
 

1966 films
Argentine comedy films
1960s Spanish-language films
Films directed by Fernando Ayala
1960s Argentine films